Derivart is an interdisciplinary art group located in Barcelona. It is constituted by Jesús Rodríguez (fine artist and independent curator), Mar Canet Sola (artist and creative engineer) and Daniel Beunza (a sociologist of finance). The collective has been active since 2004, during this time they did several art projects and one curatorship project in 2006 called "Derivatives, new financial visions". The official website is: http://derivart.net

In 2006, they did a very relevant curatorship project called "New financial visions" hosted at Casa Encendida (Madrid) as part of Curatorship award Ineditos by Spanish Bank "Caja Madrid" (now called Bankia).

Some more relevant projects include:
 Burbujometro (2007):
 Hipotecadora (2007)
 The Mortgager (2007)
 Casastristes.org (2007):
 Spreadplayer (2008)
 The inspector (2009)
 The manager (2009)

References

Articles

Exhibitions
 (Catalogue of exhibition https://web.archive.org/web/20091016000550/http://www.laboralcentrodearte.org/UserFiles/File/CATALOGOS/HLL_cat_final.pdf)
 
 

Culture in Barcelona
Interdisciplinary artists